Prolobus is a genus of flowering plants in the tribe Eupatorieae within the family Asteraceae.

Species
The only known species is Prolobus nitidulus, native to the State of Bahia in eastern Brazil.

References

Eupatorieae
Monotypic Asteraceae genera
Endemic flora of Brazil